Morden Baptist Church is a Baptist church in the London Borough of Merton, England, UK. The church building is on Crown Lane part of the Morden one-way system. It is affiliated with the Baptist Union of Great Britain.

History 

"In 1880s Morden was a place of cornfields and cattle, a country district with three little far sundered groups of houses. Each group of houses had a public house at its centre. Those public houses can still be found - "The Plough", "The George" and "The Crown". On a  Sunday evening in 1885 a little company of "Lovers of Jesus" gathered in one of the shops in what is now London Road, to hold a simple evangelistic service. They met, and sang, and prayed and read the Scriptures. Near Morden one of the iron building firms had a few sample buildings on show. When they abandoned the pitch, they offered an iron chapel for sale and Queens Road Church Wimbledon, London offered to buy it for Morden".

In 1915 the membership was only 16. However the extension of the Northern line and development of Merton Park, Morden and St. Helier Estate resulted in the numbers of church members rising to 84. 1929 saw the fellowship moving across the road from the 'Tin Chapel' to the "new" School Hall. This building still remains, and is now used for sports, playgroup, luncheon club and other activities. From small beginnings above a shop in 1885, who could have foreseen that exactly 50 years later, a new church would be needed (in addition to the School Hall) to accommodate the rapidly growing fellowship. So on 9 March 1935, the new church was formally opened.

As Morden ceased to be a quiet rural parish, and become part of London's suburbia, so the Church grew, developed and changed, Morden centre changed during this period. As the church continued to grow the old buildings proved inadequate to meet those needs. In 1990 a very substantial building scheme was undertaken to provide the current improved facilities, and including an enclosed concourse new offices and a sound-proofed cresh with a view into the main church. The Church now stands with the main entrance facing up Crown Lane part of the Morden one way system.

Leadership
The Current Ministers are Reverend Elaine Youngman and Reverend Darren Powell. There are also 'a board' elected from the congregation for a term of 5 year. Their role is to be the spiritual leaders of the congregation, responsible guiding growth and development of the church both, internally and though links with the community, part of their role is seeking future vision and care of the full-time leaders.

External links
 The church website

Baptist churches in London
Churches in the London Borough of Merton
Morden